Bonnie Conte is an American model. She was born and raised in San Diego, California. She has been featured numerous times in FHM magazine and has appeared on the covers and pages of many national and international magazines and catalogues. Conte was a Deal or No Deal model (Season 1). She has appeared on numerous commercials and other television shows and music videos.

She was Miss Miami Beach Hawaiian Tropic. She resides in Southern California where she continues her career.

References
 The Official Website
 IGN Babes Interview: Bonnie Conte by Jeff Hall on June 24, 2005
 

Female models from California
Year of birth missing (living people)
Living people
21st-century American women